Naattukoru Nallaval is a 1959 Indian Tamil language film produced by Majestic Pictures and directed by Dasaratha Ramaiah. The film stars S. S. Rajendran and Vijayakumari.

Cast 
The following list was adapted from the database of Film News Anandan

Male cast
S. S. Rajendran
T. S. Balaiah
S. V. Sahasranamam
Peer Mohamed
Sivasuryan

Female cast
Vijayakumari
Pandari Bai
Kamini
K. S. Angamuthu
C. T. Rajakantham

Production 
The film was produced by R. Subbaiah under the banner Majestic Pictures and was directed by Dasaratha Ramaiah. Acharya Athreya wrote the story while the screenplay and dialogues were written by Iraniyal Ravi. R. N. Pillai handled the cinematography. Art direction was done by M. Varadhan. P. Jayaraman was in charge of choreography. Still photography was done by M. S. Gnanam.

Soundtrack 
The music for the film was composed by Master Venu, while the lyrics were penned by M. K. Athmanathan. Playback singers are Seergazhi Govindarajan, Ghantasala, A. L. Raghavan, P. B. Srinivas, T. K. Kumaresan, M. S. Rajeswari, P. Susheela, L. R. Eswari and Renuka.

References 

1950s Tamil-language films